Mallasvesi is a medium-sized lake in Finland. The lake is part of the Kokemäenjoki basin and it is located for municipalities of Pälkäne and Valkeakoski in the Pirkanmaa region. It is a part of a chain of lakes that begins from the lakes Lummene, Vehkajärvi and Vesijako at the drainage divide between the Kokemäenjoki and Kymijoki basins and flows westwards through lakes Kukkia, Iso-Roine, Hauhonselkä and Ilmoilanselkä.

See also
List of lakes in Finland

References

Kokemäenjoki basin
Lakes of Valkeakoski
Lakes of Pälkäne